This article contains information about the literary events and publications of 1977.

Events
February 20 – An episode of Doctor on the Go, co-written by Douglas Adams and Graham Chapman, marks the beginning of Adams' career as a writer for BBC radio.
March 4 – Andrés Caicedo commits suicide by overdose, aged 25, about a month after the publication of his novel ¡Que viva la música! ("Let Music Live!", translated as Liveforever) is published in his hometown of Cali, Colombia.
April 27 – Héctor Germán Oesterheld, Argentine comic book writer born 1919), is kidnapped by the military authorities; he is believed to have died in detention a few months later.
July 11 – The English magazine Gay News is found guilty of blasphemous libel for publishing a homoerotic poem, "The Love That Dares to Speak Its Name" by James Kirkup, in a case (Whitehouse v Lemon) at the Old Bailey in London, on behalf of Mary Whitehouse's National Viewers and Listeners Association. John Mortimer appears for the defence. It is the first such prosecution since 1921 and will be the last before the offense is abolished in 2008.
September 15 – Christopher Tolkien, with Guy Gavriel Kay, completes and publishes his late father's work, The Silmarillion.
Fall – Philosophy and Literature appears as an academic journal founded at Johns Hopkins University. It explores connections between literary and philosophical studies, presenting ideas on the aesthetics of literature, critical theory, and the philosophical interpretation of literature. 
October – Norman Mailer punches Gore Vidal in the face at a New York City party.
December – Ngũgĩ wa Thiong'o and Ngugi wa Mirii are detained in Kamiti Maximum Security Prison, Kenya, six weeks after the première of their political Kikuyu language play Ngaahika Ndeenda (I Will Marry When I Want) at the open-air Kamiriithu Community Education and Cultural Centre. While imprisoned, Ngũgĩ will write the first modern novel in Kikuyu, Devil on the Cross (Caitaani mũtharaba-Inĩ), on prison-issue toilet paper.

New books

Fiction
Ales Adamovich, Janka Bryl and Uladzimir Kalesnik – Я из огненной деревни (Belarusian: Я з вогненнай вёскі; Out of the Fire)
Jorge Amado – Tieta do Agreste
 Eric Ambler – Send No More Roses
Jay Anson – The Amityville Horror
Margaret Atwood – Dancing Girls
Richard Bach – Illusions
Richard Bachman – Rage
Leland Bardwell – Girl on a Bicycle
Caroline Blackwood – Great Granny Webster
Gerd Brantenberg – Egalias døtre (The Daughters of Egalia, 1985, also Egalia's Daughters, 1986)
Terry Brooks – The Sword of Shannara
Andrés Caicedo – ¡Que viva la música!
J. M. Coetzee – In the Heart of the Country
Robin Cook – Coma
Robert Coover – The Public Burning
Basil Copper – And Afterward, the Dark
L. Sprague de Camp
The Hostage of Zir
The Queen of Zamba
L. Sprague de Camp and Lin Carter – Conan of Aquilonia
Edmund Crispin – The Glimpses of the Moon
Michel Déon – The Foundling's War
Kay Dick – They: a sequence of unease
Philip K. Dick – A Scanner Darkly
Joan Didion – A Book of Common Prayer
Buchi Emecheta – The Slave Girl
Howard Fast – The Immigrants
Timothy Findley – The Wars
Leon Forrest – The Bloodworth Orphans
John Fowles – Daniel Martin
Marilyn French – The Women's Room
Jane Gardam – Bilgewater
Helen Garner – Monkey Grip
Pauline Gedge – Child of the Morning
Richard Gordon – The Invisible Victory
Günter Grass – The Flounder (Der Butt)
Mark Helprin – Refiner's Fire
Hammond Innes – The Big Footprints
Erica Jong – How to Save Your Own Life
Elias Khoury – الجبل الصغير (al-Jabal al-saghir, The Little Mountain)
Stephen King – The Shining
Derek Lambert – Blackstone on Broadway
John le Carré – The Honourable Schoolboy
Ernest Lehman – The French Atlantic Affair
Robert Ludlum – The Chancellor Manuscript
Brian Lumley – The Horror at Oakdeene and Others
Ngaio Marsh – Last Ditch
George R. R. Martin – Dying of the Light
Colleen McCullough – The Thorn Birds
Larry McMurtry – Terms of Endearment
Robert Merle – Fortune de France
Toni Morrison – Song of Solomon
Iris Murdoch – The Sea, the Sea
Péter Nádas – The End of a Family Story
John Neal – The Genius of John Neal: Selections from His Writings (edited by Benjamin Lease and Hans-Joachim Lang)
Patrick O'Brian – The Mauritius Command
Ellis Peters – A Morbid Taste for Bones
Barbara Pym – Quartet in Autumn
Ruth Rendell – A Judgement in Stone
Alun Richards – Ennal's Point
Harold Robbins – Dreams Die First
Paul Scott – Staying On
Erich Segal – Oliver's Story
Irwin Shaw – Beggarman, Thief
M. P. Shiel – Prince Zaleski and Cummings King Monk
Sidney Sheldon – Bloodline
Leslie Marmon Silko – Ceremony
Elizabeth Smart – A Bonus
Botho Strauß – Devotion
Remy Sylado – Gali Lobang Gila Lobang
Craig Thomas – Firefox
J. R. R. Tolkien (died 1973) – The Silmarillion
Melvin Van Peebles – The True American, A Folk Fable
Mario Vargas Llosa – Aunt Julia and the Scriptwriter (La tía Julia y el escribidor)
P. G. Wodehouse (died 1975) – Sunset at Blandings
Christopher Wood – James Bond, The Spy Who Loved Me

Children and young people
Chinua Achebe
The Drum
The Flute
Richard Adams
The Plague Dogs
The Ship's Cat
Sandra Boynton – Hippos Go Berserk!
Helen Cresswell – The Bagthorpe Saga
Willi Glasauer – Le Journal Enseveli (The Buried Newspaper)
Rumer Godden – The Rocking Horse Secret
Shirley Hughes – Dogger
Diana Wynne Jones – Charmed Life
Ruth Manning-Sanders – A Book of Enchantments and Curses
C. L. Moore (with Alicia Austin) – Black God's Shadow
Bill Peet – Big Bad Bruce
Maurice Sendak – Seven Little Monsters
Barbara Smucker – Underground to Canada (also Runaway to Freedom: A Story of the Underground Railway)
Peter Spier – Noah's Ark
Judith Viorst – Alexander, Who Used to be Rich Last Sunday

Drama
Robert Bolt – State of Revolution
Roger Hall – Middle-Age Spread
Tony Harrison (adapter) – The Mysteries
Mike Leigh – Abigail's Party
Heiner Müller – Die Hamletmaschine (written)
Mary O'Malley – Once a Catholic
Dennis Potter – Brimstone and Treacle
Ngũgĩ wa Thiong'o and Ngugi wa Mirii – Ngaahika Ndeenda

Poetry

Frank Belknap Long – In Mayan Splendor

Non-fiction
Alfred D. Chandler, Jr. – The Visible Hand: The Managerial Revolution in American Business
Bruce Chatwin – In Patagonia
Robert Coles – Children of Crisis
vol. 4, Eskimos, Indians, Chicanos
vol. 5, The Privileged Ones: The Well-off and the Rich in America
Esther Deans – Esther Deans' Gardening Book: Growing Without Digging
Len Deighton – Fighter: the True Story of the Battle of Britain
Patrick Leigh Fermor – A Time Of Gifts
Jim Fixx – The Complete Book of Running
Michael Herr – Dispatches
Edith Holden (died 1920) – The Country Diary of an Edwardian Lady
R. C. Majumdar – The History and Culture of the Indian People, vol. 11
Bharati Mukherjee and Clark Blaise – Days and Nights in Calcutta
V. S. Naipaul – India: A Wounded Civilization
David M. Potter – The Impending Crisis, 1848–1861
E. F. Schumacher – A Guide for the Perplexed
A. T. Q. Stewart – The Narrow Ground: Aspects of Ulster 1609–1969
Lawrence Stone – The Family, Sex and Marriage in England, 1500–1800
Peter Ustinov – Dear Me

Births
February 21 – Jonathan Safran Foer, American novelist
March 4 – Dan Wells, American horror and science fiction author
May 2 – Alessandro D'Avenia, Italian writer
August 24 – John Green, American author and YouTube vlogger
October 16 – Laura Wade, English playwright
September 5 – Tena Štivičić, Croatian playwright
September 15 – Chimamanda Ngozi Adichie, Nigerian novelist
November 12 – Richelle Mead, American young-adult novelist

Deaths
January 14 – Anaïs Nin, French-Cuban erotic novelist and diarist (born 1903)
January 18 – Carl Zuckmayer, German playwright (born 1896)
January 26 – William Glynne-Jones, Welsh novelist and children's writer (born 1907)
February 19 – Anthony Crosland, British author and politician (born 1918)
February 27 – John Dickson Carr, American crime novelist (born 1906)
March 4
Andrés Caicedo, Colombian novelist and cinéaste (suicide, born 1951)
Mihai Gafița, Romanian editor, literary historian and children's novelist (killed in earthquake, born 1923)
Alexandru Ivasiuc, Romanian novelist (killed in earthquake, born 1933)
March 15 – Hubert Aquin, French Canadian novelist, essayist and political activist (suicide, born 1929))
April 7 – Jim Thompson, American fiction writer (born 1906)
April 11 – Jacques Prévert, French poet and screenwriter (born 1900)
May 9 – James Jones, American novelist (heart failure, born 1921)
July 2 – Vladimir Nabokov, Russian/American novelist (born 1899)
July 20 – Friedrich Georg Jünger, German writer (born 1898)
August 13 – Henry Williamson, English naturalist and novelist (born 1895)
August 20 – Gurbaksh Singh, Punjabi novelist (born 1914)
August 26  – H. A. Rey, German-born American children's writer and illustrator (born 1898)
September 4 – E. F. Schumacher, German-born economist (born 1911)
September 12 – Robert Lowell, American poet (heart attack, born 1917)
October 27 – James M. Cain, American novelist and newspaperman (born 1892)
November 10 – Dennis Wheatley, English occult novelist (born 1897)
November 30
Miloš Crnjanski, Serbian poet and novelist (born 1893)
Terence Rattigan, English dramatist (bone cancer, born 1911)
December 9 – Clarice Lispector, Brazilian novelist (ovarian cancer, born 1920)
December 22 – Frank Thiess, German novelist (born 1890)

Awards
Nobel Prize in Literature: Vicente Aleixandre

Canada
1977 Governor General's Awards

France
Prix Goncourt: Didier Decoin, John l'enfer
Prix Médicis French: Michel Butel, L'Autre Amour
Prix Médicis International: Héctor Bianciotti, Le Traité des saisons – Argentina

Spain
Premio Miguel de Cervantes: Alejo Carpentier

United Kingdom
Booker Prize: Paul Mark Scott, Staying On
Carnegie Medal for children's literature: Gene Kemp, The Turbulent Term of Tyke Tiler
Eric Gregory Award: Tony Flynn, Michael Vince, David Cooke, Douglas Marshall, Melissa Murray
James Tait Black Memorial Prize for fiction: John le Carré, The Honourable Schoolboy
James Tait Black Memorial Prize for biography: George Painter, Chateaubriand: Volume 1 – The Longed-For Tempests
Knighthood for services to the theatre: Peter Hall
Queen's Gold Medal for Poetry: Norman Nicholson
Whitbread Best Book Award: Beryl Bainbridge, Injury Time

United States
American Academy of Arts and Letters Gold Medal for the Novel, Saul Bellow
Nebula Award: Frederik Pohl, Gateway
Newbery Medal for children's literature: Mildred D. Taylor, Roll of Thunder, Hear My Cry
Phi Beta Kappa Award in Science: Gerard K. O'Neill, The High Frontier: Human Colonies in Space
Pulitzer Prize for Drama: Michael Cristofer, The Shadow Box
Pulitzer Prize for Fiction: no award given
Pulitzer Prize for Poetry: James Merrill, Divine Comedies
Pulitzer Prize for History: David M. Potter: The Impending Crisis, 1841-1861 (Completed and edited by Don E. Fehrenbacher).
Pulitzer Prize for Biography: John E. Mack: A Prince of Our Disorder: The Life of T.E. Lawrence

Rest of the World
Miles Franklin Award: Ruth Park, Swords and Crowns and Rings
Premio Nadal: José Asenjo Sedano, Conversación sobre la guerra
Viareggio Prize: Davide Lajolo, Veder l'erba dalla parte delle radici

Notes

References

 
Years of the 20th century in literature